Pinola may refer to:

Pinola, Indiana
Pinola, Mississippi